Laura Harmon (born 26 November 1986) is an Irish LGBT - and women's rights activist and candidate for the Seanad NUI Panel 2020. She is a former president of the Union of Students in Ireland (USI). She was the first woman to fill the role in twenty years. In 2018, Harmon was Mobilisation team lead for the Together For Yes campaign to repeal the Eighth Amendment of the Constitution of Ireland.

Political career 
A graduate of University College Cork, Harmon served as Vice-President for Equality and Citizenship of the Union of Students in Ireland (USI) from 2012–14. While in this role she co-signed a letter sent to Russia's ambassador to Ireland Maxim Peshkov, titled "Re: Torture of Russian LGBTQ* teenagers".

Harmon would go on to become President of the USI and, in what was described as an "unprecedented move", USI later endorsed her 2016 candidacy for the Seanad. During her tenure as USI president, Harmon played a prominent role in the campaign to legalise same-sex marriage. She was also a board member of the Higher Education Authority (2014–15)

The Labour Party appointed Harmon as its Women and Equality Officer in September 2015, ahead of the 2016 general election. She used this role to work on repealing the Eighth Amendment of the Constitution of Ireland.

During the Together For Yes campaign to repeal Eighth Amendment of the Constitution of Ireland, Harmon was the lead of the Mobilisation team. This work included organizing a national conversations tour which traveled across Ireland, co-ordinating the Get out The Vote phase of the campaign, organizing regional launches and working on the register to vote campaign.

Seanad campaigns 
Harmon was an independent candidate for the NUI constituency at the 2016 Seanad election. She announced her decision to contest the election on 2 March 2016. She polled 1,477 votes or 4.1% of first preferences but was not elected, coming in fifth out of thirty candidates. Harmon decided to seek election to the Seanad NUI constituency again in 2020. She polled 2,187 first preference votes or 5.8%, increasing her first preferences since the 2016 election. She polled 11.4% of the overall votes, but wasn't elected.

Personal life 
The eldest of five daughters born to Ted and Mary Harmon in the Gaeltacht of Ballyvourney, County Cork, Harmon is openly gay. She was educated through Irish and currently lives in Dublin.

See also 
 LGBT rights in the Republic of Ireland

References

External links
 Harmon, Laura. "After Crucial Steps Forward, Students Cannot Afford to Sit on Their Laurels", The University Times, 2 October 2018.
Harmon, Laura. "We need to ensure all citizens have their say", Evening Echo, 12 October 2018.
Harmon, Laura. "Yes to marriage equality would show that LGBT lives are valued", The Irish Times, 30 March 2015.
 Harmon, Laura. "The Next Steps for LGBT Equality in Ireland", The Times, 20 October 2015.

1986 births
Living people
Alumni of University College Cork
Irish LGBT politicians
Irish LGBT rights activists
Lesbian politicians
Irish women activists
People from County Cork
Irish women's rights activists
Irish political people
Irish activists
Irish socialist feminists